Harry Viens is a New Hampshire politician.

Viens graduated from University of Connecticut School of Business with a M.B.A. and from Georgetown University with B.A. in English.

On November 6, 2018, Viens was elected to the New Hampshire House of Representatives where he represents the Belknap 1 district. Viens assumed office on December 5, 2018. Viens is a Republican.

Viens resides in Center Harbor, New Hampshire.

References

Living people
University of Connecticut alumni
People from Center Harbor, New Hampshire
Georgetown College (Georgetown University) alumni
Republican Party members of the New Hampshire House of Representatives
21st-century American politicians
Year of birth missing (living people)